Argyrotaenia jamaicana is a species of moth of the family Tortricidae. It is found in Jamaica.

References

jamaicana
Moths of the Caribbean
Lepidoptera of Jamaica
Moths described in 2000